Berezovaya Staritsa is a rural locality (a settlement) in Krasnovishersky District, Perm Krai, Russia. The population was 168 as of 2010. There are 4 streets.

Geography 
Berezovaya Staritsa is located 43 km southwest of Krasnovishersk (the district's administrative centre) by road. Bulatovo is the nearest rural locality.

References 

Rural localities in Krasnovishersky District